The 1983 United States Grand Prix West (officially the Toyota Grand Prix of Long Beach) was a Formula One motor race held on March 27, 1983 at Long Beach, California. It was the second race of the 1983 Formula One World Championship.

The 75-lap race was won by Northern Irishman John Watson, driving a McLaren-Ford. Watson took his fifth and final F1 victory having started from 22nd position, the lowest from which a driver has won an F1 race. Austrian teammate Niki Lauda finished second, having himself started 23rd, with Frenchman René Arnoux third in a Ferrari.

This was the final running of the Long Beach race as an F1 event, before organizer Chris Pook switched to the CART IndyCar series.

Qualifying

Qualifying report
Once again, the Long Beach circuit had been slightly modified, primarily to free up Ocean Boulevard, one of the city's main thoroughfares. Since the alternate route on Seaside Way included a tunnel under the Long Beach convention center, the pits were moved to the long, curving Shoreline Drive section, where the Start and Finish lines were reunited for the first time since 1977.

As practice began on Friday, two bumps where the circuit rejoined the old layout at the end of the Seaside Way straight were causing problems. Some teams were concerned that the suspension on their cars would not last more than a few laps under race conditions. René Arnoux (Ferrari) was the first to go over the bumps flat out and his 1:26.935 led Alain Prost (Renault), Patrick Tambay (Ferrari) and Riccardo Patrese (Brabham) on the day's timing chart, while Nelson Piquet (Brabham), Lauda and Watson found their Michelin qualifying tires virtually useless and set poor times.

Overnight repair work smoothed the problematic bumps. Tambay grabbed his first pole with a lap of 1:26.117, the only lap to beat teammate Arnoux's Friday time; Keke Rosberg (Williams) took third with 1:27.145, ahead of teammate Jacques Laffite. American Danny Sullivan (Tyrrell), in his only season of Formula One, managed ninth, while the other American in F1, Eddie Cheever (driving the older model Renault RE30C) was 15th, 7 places behind team mate Prost in the newer RE40 model. The McLarens of Watson and Lauda were never able to arrive at a balanced setup, and they would start in 22nd and 23rd position.

Qualifying classification

† — time disallowed

Race

Race report
The race took place in warm and sunny conditions. Tambay held the lead at the first corner. Rosberg, immediately behind him, tried to squeeze through the middle of the all-Ferrari front row. He touched Arnoux's right front with his left rear as he swung wide, but both continued, with Rosberg in second, followed by Laffite and Arnoux. Rosberg spun later in the lap while attempting to overtake, but continued without damage.

After one lap, Sullivan was up to sixth, behind Arnoux, and Cheever was ninth, immediately behind Prost. Sullivan was passed by Patrese on the second lap, and then by Prost and Cheever on lap three. Before long, however, Prost began dropping back with a misfire that had been plaguing him recurrently all weekend, and he finally pitted on lap 16. Cheever was able to get by Arnoux and Patrese when Arnoux began to lose grip from his Goodyears, and was up into fifth place. When Cheever entered the Renault pit for a new set of tires, however, he found the crew still working on Prost's car; he was forced to continue. Prost's problem was eventually solved and he continued, albeit three laps down.

Meanwhile, Rosberg had regained second place behind Tambay and, by lap 20, was again looking for a way by. The top six cars were all running very close together, and Rosberg soon found himself under increasing pressure from Laffite, who was in turn being hounded by Jean-Pierre Jarier's Ligier and Patrese's Brabham.

On lap 26, Rosberg attempted to take the lead again, but collided with Tambay, who spun and stalled. Rosberg continued again, driving around the outside of the disabled car. As he entered the chicane before the start/finish line, he found his teammate Laffite alongside and Jarier almost touching his gearbox behind. The two Williams cars touched briefly, and Jarier ran into the back of Rosberg, who hit the wall, bounced off, and hit it again before sliding to a stop. Jarier continued, but only briefly, as a damaged front wing had spoiled his handling, and he retired in the pits.

Laffite was now in the lead, with Patrese in second. By lap 28, the McLarens were lying third and fourth, having passed Marc Surer, Sullivan and Johnny Cecotto. When Watson got by Lauda at the end of Shoreline Drive, he was 20 seconds behind the two leaders. With Watson closing the gap to the front and Laffite's tires going off quickly, Patrese challenged Laffite for the lead. He slid wide, and Watson and Lauda both passed before he rejoined the track. Soon after, the McLarens passed Laffite as well, and, from 22nd and 23rd on the grid, were now first and second.

With Laffite still struggling with his tires, Patrese was able to catch him up again and took third on lap 52. Arnoux was coming back through the field after a second tire stop, and was waging battle with Cheever for fifth place when they came upon Laffite on lap 67, again at the end of Shoreline Drive. At the hairpin, the Williams and Ferrari swapped places around Cheever, as Arnoux went from sixth to fourth in one corner. On the next lap, however, Cheever lost fifth place when he pulled off with a broken gearbox. With just three laps to go, Patrese retired from third place when his distributor broke.

Semi-retired  World Champion, Australian Alan Jones replaced regular Arrows driver Chico Serra for the race in what was to prove to be a short-lived comeback to Formula One. After qualifying a credible 12th on the grid in the Cosworth powered Arrows A6, Jones ran in the top 10 until retiring on lap 58 with fatigue. Jones, who had only raced at home in Australia since retiring from F1 following the  season, was still suffering the effects of a fall from a horse on his farm a couple of months earlier where he had broken his hip.

Lauda, suffering from a worsening cramp in his right leg, could not challenge Watson in the later stages, and the Ulsterman came home nearly half a minute ahead for his fifth victory. It was the farthest back from which a modern Grand Prix driver had ever come to win a race. Arnoux came through for third, and Laffite hung on for fourth, ahead of Surer and Cecotto, who scored a point in his second F1 race. It was the first ever points for a Venezuelan driver, and the last until Pastor Maldonado finished tenth in the 2011 Belgian Grand Prix.

Rumors persisted all weekend that race organizer Chris Pook, the main figure in the attempt to create a "Monte Carlo of the United States" in Long Beach, had decided that Formula One was too expensive and risky, and, indeed, after the race, he announced that he planned to run a CART race at Long Beach in 1984 instead of F1. Despite tremendous success since the race's inception in 1976, and the observable impact of the global exposure it brought to the city and to the Los Angeles area in general, the organizers believed that the less expensive and more popular (in the United States at least) CART championship, dominated by American drivers, would be a more promising investment.

Race classification

Championship standings after the race

Drivers' Championship standings

Constructors' Championship standings

References

Further reading
 Rob Walker (July 1983). "8th United States Grand Prix West: Whiz Kids". Road & Track, 144–149.
 Mike S. Lang (1992). Grand Prix!: Race-by-race account of Formula 1 World Championship motor racing. Volume 4: 1981 to 1984. Haynes Publishing Group. 

United States Grand Prix West
United States Grand Prix West
United States Grand Prix West
United States Grand Prix West